Kyan Anderson (born March 25, 1992) is an American professional basketball player who plays for Labas Gas Prienai of the Lithuanian Basketball League.He competed in college for Texas Christian University (TCU).

College career
Anderson averaged 17.0 points and 4.5 assists per game as a junior at TCU. As a senior, he averaged 13.4 points per game and finished seventh all-time in TCU scoring.

Professional career
In the 2015–16 season, Anderson played for Okapi Aalstar of the Belgian league. He led the team in scoring with 15.9 points per game. The following season, he signed with medi Bayreuth. He posted 12 points, 1.7 rebounds and 3.6 assists per contest. In July 2017, Anderson signed with Élan Béarnais Pau-Lacq-Orthez. He left the team in January 2018 after averaging 9.3 points and 4.4 assists per game.

On August 19, 2018, Anderson signed with Sigal Prishtina of the Kosovan league.

On July 31, 2019, he signed with BG Göttingen of the Basketball Bundesliga.

On June 16, 2020, he has signed with Falco KC of the Hungarian Basketball League.

On August 2, 2021, he has signed with Gießen 46ers of the Basketball Bundesliga.

On February 22, 2022, he has signed with MLP Academics Heidelberg of the Basketball Bundesliga.

On July 8, 2022, he signed with Alliance Sport Alsace of the French LNB Pro B.

References

External links
TCU Horned Frogs bio

1992 births
Living people
American expatriate basketball people in Belgium
American expatriate basketball people in France
American expatriate basketball people in Germany
American men's basketball players
Basketball players from Texas
BG Göttingen players
Giessen 46ers players
Point guards
Sportspeople from Fort Worth, Texas
TCU Horned Frogs men's basketball players